David Martin James McGreevy nicknamed "Bonzo" (born 24 October 1985) is a former Gaelic footballer who played for Kingdom Kerry Gaels and London GAA as a corner back. He is originally from Teconnaught, County Down, and moved to England in 2009, before returning to Northern Ireland in 2018.

McGreevy was part of the team that reached the 2013 Connacht Senior Football Championship Final on 21 July, losing out to Mayo 5-11 0-10. They went on to lose in Round 4 of All-Ireland Senior Championship 1-17 1–10 against Cavan on 27 July at Croke Park.

In 2020, he helped start and is currently secretary to the East Belfast GAA, which is noted for being one of the few cross-community Gaelic Associations.

References

External links

1985 births
Living people
People from County Down
London inter-county Gaelic footballers
Kingdom Kerry Gaels Gaelic footballers